Vadim Muratovich Khinchagov (born 30 August 1981) is a Russian former football midfielder.

Career
Previously played for FC Alania Vladikavkaz, FC Ekibastuzets, FC Rostov and SKA Rostov-on-Don. He was called for Kazakhstan national football team for the first time in June 2008, but not played.

On 4 February 2015, Khinchagov resigned for FC Sakhalin Yuzhno-Sakhalinsk.

References

External links
 
 

1981 births
Living people
Association football midfielders
Russian footballers
Russian expatriate footballers
Expatriate footballers in Kazakhstan
FC Spartak Vladikavkaz players
FC Rostov players
FC SKA Rostov-on-Don players
Russian expatriate sportspeople in Kazakhstan
Russian Premier League players
FC Sakhalin Yuzhno-Sakhalinsk players